Superbird-9, will be a geostationary communications satellite operated by SKY Perfect JSAT and designed and manufactured by Airbus Defence and Space. Superbird-9 will be based on Airbus's reconfigurable payload satellite bus OneSat, which can steer and reassign beams for different customers and services. It will be offering Ku-band and Ka-band communication services to the Japanese market. SKY Perfect JSAT, the main satellite operator in Japan, has selected Airbus to build Superbird-9 and contracted SpaceX to launch it on Starship.

See also 

 SKY PerfecTV! – Satellite TV division of the same owner corporation and major user of Superbird

References 

Communications satellites in geostationary orbit
Communications satellites of Japan
2024 in Japan